Fritz Herman Vilhelm Eckert, (25 April 1852 - 6 March 1920) was a Swedish architect.

Biography
Fritz Herman Vilhelm Eckert was born in Stockholm, Sweden.
He attended the Royal Swedish Academy of Arts from 1871-1878 and spent 1879 travelling abroad. 
He was employed as an architect by the Swedish public construction service (Överintendentsämbetet)  in 1878 and was made a curator of this service in 1904. From 1880 he lectured at the Stockholm-based KTH Royal Institute of Technology.

Eckert designed Curmanska Villan at Floragatan (1880), Royal Stables in Stockholm (1895),  Antuna Gård in Upplands Väsby (1881), YWCA building in Stockholm (1905) and the Mariestad City Library (1895–96) as well as contributing to numerous church restorations.

Gallery

References

1852 births
1920 deaths
Artists from Stockholm
Swedish architects
Academic staff of the KTH Royal Institute of Technology